George Chappell McWattie (22 April 1875 – 1952) was a Scottish footballer who played as a goalkeeper for Arbroath, Hibernian, Queen's Park, Heart of Midlothian and Scotland. He played in the 1901–02 World Championship in which Hearts defeated Tottenham Hotspur over two legs, and in the 1903 Scottish Cup Final which Hearts lost to Rangers after two replays.

References

Sources

External links

London Hearts profile (Scotland)
London Hearts profile (Scottish League)
FitbaStats profile (Hibernian)

1875 births
1952 deaths
Association football goalkeepers
Scottish footballers
Scotland international footballers
Arbroath F.C. players
Hibernian F.C. players
Queen's Park F.C. players
Heart of Midlothian F.C. players
Scottish Football League players
Scottish Football League representative players
Footballers from Angus, Scotland
People from Arbroath